Aldeburgh in Suffolk, was a parliamentary borough represented in the House of Commons of the Parliament of the United Kingdom and its predecessor bodies.

History
The town was enfranchised in 1571 as a borough constituency in the House of Commons of the Parliament of England and continued in the Parliaments of Great Britain and the United Kingdom until it was abolished in 1832 as a rotten borough.
 
It was represented by two burgesses. The right to vote was vested in the town's freemen, although the electoral roll was controlled by the Corporation of Aldeburgh which consisted of two bailiffs (the returning officers), 12 aldermen, and 24 common councilmen. Originally it had been strongly influenced by the Howard family and although the family lost some power due to their Catholicism the Arundel family were still nominating MPs in the seventeenth century.  It gradually fell under the control of the Tory Henry Johnson who with his brother represented it for 30 years from 1689 although Whig political influence was growing and after unsuccessful challenges in 1708 and 1713 the borough was captured after the brothers' death by the Whigs at a reputed cost of £9,000. By the mid-18th century it had been "stolen" from being a Government influenced seat by a City of London merchant, Thomas Fonnereau: and later came under the control of his cousin Philip Champion Crespigny who sold it for £39,000 and eventually it devolved to the control of the Marquess of Hertford.

It was described as "a venal little borough in Suffolk".

Boundaries 
The constituency comprised the parliamentary borough of Aldeburgh, in the county of Suffolk in Eastern England.

Members of Parliament

MPs 1571–1640

MPs 1640–1832

Election results

Elections in the 1830s

See also
List of former United Kingdom Parliament constituencies
Unreformed House of Commons

References

D Brunton & D H Pennington, Members of the Long Parliament (London: George Allen & Unwin, 1954)
Cobbett's Parliamentary history of England, from the Norman Conquest in 1066 to the year 1803 (London: Thomas Hansard, 1808) 
 Maija Jansson (ed.), Proceedings in Parliament, 1614 (House of Commons) (Philadelphia: American Philosophical Society, 1988) 
Henry Stooks Smith, The Parliaments of England from 1715 to 1847 (2nd edition, edited by FWS Craig - Chichester: Parliamentary Reference Publications, 1973)

Parliamentary constituencies in Suffolk (historic)
Constituencies of the Parliament of the United Kingdom established in 1571
Constituencies of the Parliament of the United Kingdom disestablished in 1832
Rotten boroughs
Aldeburgh